Margaret Grundy (born 1938), is a female former swimmer who competed for England.

Swimming career
She represented England and won a bronze medal in the 220 yards breaststroke at the 1954 British Empire and Commonwealth Games in Vancouver, Canada. At the ASA National British Championships she won the 220 yards breaststroke title in 1943 and 1954.

She was coached by Lucy Morton.

References

1938 births
English female swimmers
Commonwealth Games medallists in swimming
Commonwealth Games bronze medallists for England
Living people
Swimmers at the 1954 British Empire and Commonwealth Games
Medallists at the 1954 British Empire and Commonwealth Games